Inside is a 2023 psychological thriller film written by Ben Hopkins and directed by Vasilis Katsoupis in his feature directorial debut. It stars Willem Dafoe, Gene Bervoets, and Eliza Stuyck.

Inside had its world premiere at the 2023 Berlin International Film Festival, on 20 February 2023, and in the United States on 17 March 2023, by Focus Features.

Plot
Nemo, an art thief, tells a story of his childhood. A teacher asked him to choose three things to save in a house fire. Rather than his family, Nemo selected his cat, an AC/DC record, and his sketchbook. He reflects that the cat died and he lost the album, but he still has the sketchbook, saying "art is for keeps".

In the present day, disguised as a handyman, Nemo breaks into the skyscraper penthouse home of a wealthy art collector in order to steal three works by Egon Schiele, but is unable to find Schiele's self-portrait. Nemo's attempt to leave sets off the security system and seals the apartment, and his contacts abandon him. His attempts to escape prove futile. A broken thermometer renders the penthouse too hot and then too cold, and Nemo struggles with a lack of food and water, save for timed sprinklers in an indoor garden. Following Nemo's entry through bird netting over the apartment's patio, a pigeon becomes trapped, starving and dying while Nemo watches.

As weeks pass, Nemo goes hungry and suffers injuries as a result of his escape attempts, which focus on constructing an enormous scaffold from furniture to reach a skylight. Nemo makes gradual progress in disassembling the frame around the skylight with tools he constructs from artwork and furniture. He develops an obsession with a young housekeeper, dubbed "Jasmine," whom he stalks via a security camera feed that plays on the apartment television.

Nemo discovers a hidden passage in the back of a closet that leads to a room containing the Schiele self-portrait and a collation of The Marriage of Heaven and Hell. Desperate, Nemo eats fish from the art collector's aquarium and dog food, eventually suffering from tooth decay and intermittent hallucinations of the art collector and Jasmine. While removing bolts from the skylight, he falls to the ground and breaks his leg, He constructs a splint, but his health and sanity continue to deteriorate along with the apartment. Over time, he studies the apartment's art, creates his own artwork, and makes intricate drawings on the walls.

Nemo sets off a smoke alarm in attempt to get help, flooding the penthouse in the process but attracting no outside attention. Nemo leaves the art collector a note written on the walls, reiterating the story from his childhood, and apologizing for breaking into and destroying his home but stating that it may have been necessary as "there is no creation without destruction". He concludes the apology by saying that he has saved three pieces of art before climbing the scaffold, removing the skylight, and ascending out of view.

Cast and characters
 Willem Dafoe as Nemo
 Gene Bervoets as owner
 Eliza Stuyck as Jasmine

Production
Principal photography wrapped on 1 June 2021.

Release
The film had its world premiere at the 2023 Berlin International Film Festival on 20 February 2023. It was released in the United States through Focus Features on 17 March 2023.

Reception

References

External links
 

2023 thriller films
Belgian thriller films
German thriller films
Greek thriller films
English-language Belgian films
English-language German films
English-language Greek films
Films set in apartment buildings
2023 psychological thriller films